Peter Haslop (born 17 October 1941 in Midhurst, Sussex) is a former English cricketer. Haslop was a right-handed batsman who bowled right-arm medium pace.

Haslop made his first-class debut for Hampshire against the touring Pakistanis in the 1962 season. He took two wickets for 82 runs in the Pakistan innings. His wickets were those of wicketkeeper Imtiaz Ahmed and Ijaz Butt. This match would be Haslop's only first-class match.

Nine years after his last match for Hampshire, Haslop returned to the club in the 1971 season. Haslop made his one-day debut against Leicestershire. Haslop represented the club in four one-day matches, the last of which came against Gloucestershire in 1972. Haslop took four wickets at an average of 39.25 in his four one-day matches for the club.

External links
Peter Haslop at Cricinfo
Peter Haslop at CricketArchive

1941 births
Living people
People from Midhurst
English cricketers
Hampshire cricketers